Malcolm Binns (born 29 January 1936) is a British classical pianist.

Biography
Malcolm Binns was born in Nottingham, England, in 1936.  He studied music at the Royal College of Music in London from 1952 to 1956, including piano with Arthur Alexander.  He made his London debut in 1957 and his Wigmore Hall debut in 1958.

He has frequently appeared at the Proms in London, starting in 1960. In 1961 he gave the British premiere of the Piano Concerto No. 4, for left hand, by Prokofiev.  From 1961 to 1964 he was a professor at the RCM.  Amongst his pupils was Robert John Godfrey of progressive rock band, The Enid. He first started working in a chamber duo with the violinist Manoug Parikian in 1966.

Binns is a noted authority on British piano music, his repertoire thereof including works by Arnold Bax, Richard Rodney Bennett, William Sterndale Bennett (he has recorded 5 of the 6 piano concertos), Frank Bridge, Benjamin Britten, Hamilton Harty, John Ireland, Patrick Piggott, Alan Rawsthorne, Edmund Rubbra and Charles Villiers Stanford.

His recordings include the first complete recording of the Beethoven sonatas on original instruments, concertos by Balakirev and Rimsky-Korsakov, the Transcendental Studies of Lyapunov, works by Hummel and Medtner, as well as works from the standard repertoire by Bartók, Brahms, Chopin, Falla, Franck, Saint-Saëns, Gershwin, Grieg, Liszt, Mozart, Poulenc, Rachmaninoff, Ravel and Schumann.

He has appeared with the London Philharmonic Orchestra every year since 1962. He has appeared with many other orchestras and conductors internationally and performed on numerous BBC radio broadcasts.

He celebrated his 60th birthday with an all-Chopin recital which included the complete studies from Opp. 10 and 25.

References

1936 births
Living people
British classical pianists
Male classical pianists
People from Nottingham
Alumni of the Royal College of Music
Academics of the Royal College of Music
Piano pedagogues
21st-century classical pianists
21st-century British male musicians